Talalora, officially the Municipality of Talalora, is a 6th class municipality in the province of Samar, Philippines. According to the 2020 census, it has a population of 7,856 people.

Talalora was created from the barrios of Mallorga, Tulac, Talalora, Tatabonan, Navatas, and Navatas Guti of the town of Villareal, by virtue of Republic Act No. 192, on June 22, 1947.

Geography

Barangays
Talalora is politically subdivided into 11 barangays.
 Brgy. Independencia
 Malaguining
 Mallorga
 Navatas Daku
 Navatas Guti
 Placer
 Poblacion Barangay I
 Poblacion Barangay II
 San Juan
 Tatabunan
 Victory

Climate

Demographics

Economy

References

External links
 Talalora Profile at PhilAtlas.com
 [ Philippine Standard Geographic Code]
 Philippine Census Information
 Local Governance Performance Management System

Municipalities of Samar (province)